Hamatocanthoscypha is a genus of fungi within the Hyaloscyphaceae family. The genus contains about 13 species.

Species:
 Hamatocanthoscypha laricionis
 Hamatocanthoscypha ocellata
 Hamatocanthoscypha straminella
 Hamatocanthoscypha uncinata
 Hamatocanthoscypha uncipila

References

Hyaloscyphaceae